Flash - Der Fotoreporter is a 1993 German television series, about a press photographer named Flash. Six 90 minute episodes were produced by Taurus Film. It stars Oliver Tobias, Catherine Alric, Frédéric Darié and Saïd Amadis. Claudia Cardinale and François Levantal appeared as guests in the TV Series.

References

External links
 

1992 French television series debuts
1992 French television series endings
1990s French television series
1993 German television series debuts
1993 German television series endings
Television series about journalism
ZDF original programming